Acantharctia is a genus of tiger moths in the family Erebidae, found in the Afrotropics.

Species
 Acantharctia ansorgei Rothschild, 1910
 Acantharctia atriramosa Hampson, 1907
 Acantharctia bivittata (Butler, 1898)
 Acantharctia flavicosta (Hampson, 1900)
 Acantharctia latifasciata Hampson, 1909
 Acantharctia latifusca (Hampson, 1907)
 Acantharctia metaleuca Hampson, 1901
 Acantharctia mundata (Walker, [1865])
 Acantharctia nigrivena Rothschild, 1935
 Acantharctia nivea Aurivillius, 1899 [1900]
 Acantharctia tenuifasciata Hampson, 1910
 Acantharctia vittata Aurivillius, 1899 [1900]

Former species
 Acantharctia bicoloria Gaede, 1916

References
 

Spilosomina
Moth genera